The Rubtsovsk constituency (No.40) is a Russian legislative constituency in the Altai Krai. Until 2007 the constituency covered most of southern and south-western Altai Krai but in 2016 it shedded its rural southern districts to formerly urban Barnaul constituency. In its current form Rubtsovsk constituency stretches from Barnaul to Rubtsovsk in the Krai's southwestern corner.

Members elected

Election results

1993

|-
! colspan=2 style="background-color:#E9E9E9;text-align:left;vertical-align:top;" |Candidate
! style="background-color:#E9E9E9;text-align:left;vertical-align:top;" |Party
! style="background-color:#E9E9E9;text-align:right;" |Votes
! style="background-color:#E9E9E9;text-align:right;" |%
|-
|style="background-color:"|
|align=left|Vladimir Bessarabov
|align=left|Independent
|
|25.48%
|-
| colspan="5" style="background-color:#E9E9E9;"|
|- style="font-weight:bold"
| colspan="3" style="text-align:left;" | Total
| 
| 100%
|-
| colspan="5" style="background-color:#E9E9E9;"|
|- style="font-weight:bold"
| colspan="4" |Source:
|
|}

1995

|-
! colspan=2 style="background-color:#E9E9E9;text-align:left;vertical-align:top;" |Candidate
! style="background-color:#E9E9E9;text-align:left;vertical-align:top;" |Party
! style="background-color:#E9E9E9;text-align:right;" |Votes
! style="background-color:#E9E9E9;text-align:right;" |%
|-
|style="background-color:"|
|align=left|Nikolay Gerasimenko
|align=left|Independent
|
|31.79%
|-
|style="background-color:"|
|align=left|Yury Visloguzov
|align=left|Agrarian Party
|
|29.45%
|-
|style="background-color:"|
|align=left|Valery Zhogov
|align=left|Liberal Democratic Party
|
|9.92%
|-
|style="background-color:#DA2021"|
|align=left|Vladimir Bessarabov (incumbent)
|align=left|Ivan Rybkin Bloc
|
|8.01%
|-
|style="background-color:"|
|align=left|Vladislav Sadykov
|align=left|Independent
|
|6.95%
|-
|style="background-color:"|
|align=left|Aleksey Shvedunov
|align=left|Independent
|
|5.42%
|-
|style="background-color:"|
|align=left|Aleksandr Dorokhov
|align=left|Independent
|
|1.37%
|-
|style="background-color:"|
|align=left|Vasily Korniyenko
|align=left|Independent
|
|0.62%
|-
|style="background-color:#000000"|
|colspan=2 |against all
|
|5.01%
|-
| colspan="5" style="background-color:#E9E9E9;"|
|- style="font-weight:bold"
| colspan="3" style="text-align:left;" | Total
| 
| 100%
|-
| colspan="5" style="background-color:#E9E9E9;"|
|- style="font-weight:bold"
| colspan="4" |Source:
|
|}

1999

|-
! colspan=2 style="background-color:#E9E9E9;text-align:left;vertical-align:top;" |Candidate
! style="background-color:#E9E9E9;text-align:left;vertical-align:top;" |Party
! style="background-color:#E9E9E9;text-align:right;" |Votes
! style="background-color:#E9E9E9;text-align:right;" |%
|-
|style="background-color:"|
|align=left|Nikolay Gerasimenko (incumbent)
|align=left|Independent
|
|61.64%
|-
|style="background-color:"|
|align=left|Aleksey Shvedunov
|align=left|Independent
|
|14.04%
|-
|style="background-color:"|
|align=left|Yevgeny Pyatkov
|align=left|Independent
|
|10.52%
|-
|style="background-color:"|
|align=left|Vladimir Stupin
|align=left|Independent
|
|5.51%
|-
|style="background-color:#000000"|
|colspan=2 |against all
|
|6.70%
|-
| colspan="5" style="background-color:#E9E9E9;"|
|- style="font-weight:bold"
| colspan="3" style="text-align:left;" | Total
| 
| 100%
|-
| colspan="5" style="background-color:#E9E9E9;"|
|- style="font-weight:bold"
| colspan="4" |Source:
|
|}

2003

|-
! colspan=2 style="background-color:#E9E9E9;text-align:left;vertical-align:top;" |Candidate
! style="background-color:#E9E9E9;text-align:left;vertical-align:top;" |Party
! style="background-color:#E9E9E9;text-align:right;" |Votes
! style="background-color:#E9E9E9;text-align:right;" |%
|-
|style="background-color:#FFD700"|
|align=left|Nikolay Gerasimenko (incumbent)
|align=left|People's Party
|
|54.04%
|-
|style="background-color:"|
|align=left|Mikhail Zapolev
|align=left|Communist Party
|
|19.27%
|-
|style="background-color:#1042A5"|
|align=left|Igor Levin
|align=left|Union of Right Forces
|
|7.14%
|-
|style="background-color:"|
|align=left|Boris Chashchin
|align=left|Liberal Democratic Party
|
|5.39%
|-
|style="background-color:"|
|align=left|Vladimir Nikulin
|align=left|Rodina
|
|3.36%
|-
|style="background-color:"|
|align=left|Vladimir Strukchinsky
|align=left|Yabloko
|
|1.66%
|-
|style="background-color:#000000"|
|colspan=2 |against all
|
|7.59%
|-
| colspan="5" style="background-color:#E9E9E9;"|
|- style="font-weight:bold"
| colspan="3" style="text-align:left;" | Total
| 
| 100%
|-
| colspan="5" style="background-color:#E9E9E9;"|
|- style="font-weight:bold"
| colspan="4" |Source:
|
|}

2016

|-
! colspan=2 style="background-color:#E9E9E9;text-align:left;vertical-align:top;" |Candidate
! style="background-color:#E9E9E9;text-align:leftt;vertical-align:top;" |Party
! style="background-color:#E9E9E9;text-align:right;" |Votes
! style="background-color:#E9E9E9;text-align:right;" |%
|-
|style="background-color:"|
|align=left|Viktor Zobnev
|align=left|United Russia
|
|30.90%
|-
|style="background-color:"|
|align=left|Nina Ostanina
|align=left|Communist Party
|
|16.43%
|-
|style="background-color:"|
|align=left|Irina Shudra
|align=left|Liberal Democratic Party
|
|16.31%
|-
|style="background:"| 
|align=left|Vladislav Vakayev
|align=left|A Just Russia
|
|16.08%
|-
|style="background:"| 
|align=left|Anton Kramskov
|align=left|Communists of Russia
|
|5.33%
|-
|style="background-color:"|
|align=left|Nikolay Nazarenko
|align=left|Rodina
|
|4.04%
|-
|style="background:"| 
|align=left|Viktor Rau
|align=left|Yabloko
|
|2.34%
|-
|style="background:"| 
|align=left|Aleksandr Zonov
|align=left|Party of Growth
|
|1.90%
|-
|style="background-color:"|
|align=left|Sergey Malykhin
|align=left|The Greens
|
|1.84%
|-
| colspan="5" style="background-color:#E9E9E9;"|
|- style="font-weight:bold"
| colspan="3" style="text-align:left;" | Total
| 
| 100%
|-
| colspan="5" style="background-color:#E9E9E9;"|
|- style="font-weight:bold"
| colspan="4" |Source:
|
|}

2021

|-
! colspan=2 style="background-color:#E9E9E9;text-align:left;vertical-align:top;" |Candidate
! style="background-color:#E9E9E9;text-align:left;vertical-align:top;" |Party
! style="background-color:#E9E9E9;text-align:right;" |Votes
! style="background-color:#E9E9E9;text-align:right;" |%
|-
|style="background-color:"|
|align=left|Maria Prusakova
|align=left|Communist Party
|
|27.12%
|-
|style="background-color: " |
|align=left|Sergey Struchenko
|align=left|United Russia
|
|22.16%
|-
|style="background-color: " |
|align=left|Lyudmila Suslova
|align=left|A Just Russia — For Truth
|
|8.84%
|-
|style="background-color:"|
|align=left|Yelena Kurnosova
|align=left|Communists of Russia
|
|7.78%
|-
|style="background-color:"|
|align=left|Irina Shudra
|align=left|Liberal Democratic Party
|
|7.73%
|-
|style="background-color:"|
|align=left|Vladislav Vakayev
|align=left|New People
|
|7.72%
|-
|style="background-color:"|
|align=left|Viktor Dvornikov
|align=left|Party of Pensioners
|
|5.08%
|-
|style="background-color:"|
|align=left|Yevgeny Astakhovsky
|align=left|Rodina
|
|3.72%
|-
|style="background:"| 
|align=left|Andrey Krylov
|align=left|Yabloko
|
|3.13%
|-
|style="background:"| 
|align=left|Pavel Chesnov
|align=left|Russian Party of Freedom and Justice
|
|1.37%
|-
| colspan="5" style="background-color:#E9E9E9;"|
|- style="font-weight:bold"
| colspan="3" style="text-align:left;" | Total
| 
| 100%
|-
| colspan="5" style="background-color:#E9E9E9;"|
|- style="font-weight:bold"
| colspan="4" |Source:
|
|}

Notes

References

Russian legislative constituencies
Politics of Altai Krai